High Life Highland is a regional organisation in Scotland, responsible for cultural and sports provision in the Highland Council Area. Its activities include running libraries, museums and leisure centres. It is a registered charity under Scottish law.

High Life Highland was created by Highland Council as an "arms length" organisation responsible for developing and promoting opportunities in culture, learning, sport, leisure, health and well-being across the region.

In 2015 it was announced that Inverness Leisure would merge with High Life Highland, a process which was completed on 1 April 2016.

Activities
Sites run by High Life Highland include:
 Ferrycroft Visitor Centre, Lairg
 Highland Folk Museum
 Inverness Botanic Gardens
 Inverness Castle
 Inverness Museum and Art Gallery
 St Fergus Art Gallery, Wick, Caithness
 Strathpeffer Pavilion
 Thurso Library
 Thurso Art Gallery

References

External links

Charities based in Scotland
Highland (council area)
Organisations based in Highland (council area)